Dyseuaresta sobrinata is a species of tephritid or fruit flies in the genus Dyseuaresta of the family Tephritidae.

Distribution
United States, South to Costa Rica.

References

Tephritinae
Insects described in 1900
Diptera of North America